Logan Phillip Henderson (born September 14, 1989) is an American actor and singer. He played the role of Logan Mitchell on the Nickelodeon series Big Time Rush and is a current member of the Big Time Rush band.

Early life and career
Henderson was born in Temple, Texas and raised in North Richland Hills, Texas. His father is a school therapist and his mother works in the pharmaceutical industry.

He had a role as "Teenage Boy #2" on the television program Friday Night Lights, before moving to California at the age of 18 to pursue an acting career.

2009–14 / 2021–present: Big Time Rush
Henderson's breakthrough role was Big Time Rush where he played the character Logan Mitchell. Henderson and the rest of Big Time Rush made an appearance at the 2010 and 2013 Kids' Choice Awards and performed at the 2011 Kids' Choice Awards. He also appeared in an episode of BrainSurge during the week of April 18–22, 2011. Henderson and Big Time Rush made a guest appearance on Figure It Out in June 2012.

Henderson signed with Sony Music Entertainment and Columbia Records as a part of Big Time Rush in 2009. After releasing four promotional singles including "Big Time Rush", "City Is Ours", "Halfway There", and "Til I Forget About You" the group released their debut album B.T.R. on October 11, 2010. On the album, Henderson co-wrote on the song "Oh Yeah". B.T.R. peaked at number 3 on the Billboard 200, and at #1 on the iTunes digital albums list. It was later certified Gold in the U.S. and Mexico. They released their second album Elevate on November 21, 2011. Henderson co-wrote "Time of Our Life" with Nicholas "Ras" Furlong. In addition, Henderson co-wrote three other songs, which were "Music Sounds Better With U", "Love Me Love Me" and "Superstar". The band's third album, 24/Seven was released on June 11, 2013. Henderson co-wrote many of the songs on this album as well, including the title track "24/Seven".

2017–2021: Solo career
After the band's hiatus in 2014, Henderson took a 3-year break to focus on his personal life. In December 2016, he announced the release of his debut solo single "Sleepwalker". Released on January 27, 2017, the track introduced a new sound for the artist, described by the producer Nicholas Furlong as a “dark grunge pop sound”, which was a departure of the music of B.T.R. His second single "Bite My Tongue" was released on September 15, 2017 and continued the style of his first solo release. A third single "Speak of the Devil" was released for digital download on October 30, 2017. On February 15, 2018 a single titled "Acoustic Sessions" was released featuring his first three singles in acoustic form.

In 2018, the singer teased the release of his forthcoming debut album on his social media, posting pictures from the photo shoot including one post with the album's track list. On May 14, 2018, Henderson announced the title of his debut album, Echoes of Departure and the Endless Street of Dreams - Pt. 1, which was to be released on May 18, 2018. His single from the album, "Pull Me Deep", was released on August 14, 2018 and peaked at number 40 on the Billboard Mainstream Top 40.

Artistry 
As a lyricist and record producer, most of his songs' lyrics revolve based on his personal stories and other's stories. His debut EP was fixated around confronting tough personal battles in order to get closure and the payoff in getting comfortable with vulnerability.

Henderson grew up listening to Aretha Franklin, Billie Holiday, B.B. King, Elvis Costello and Prince.

Some of the artists who inspired him are James Brown, Ben Folds, Kanye West, Death Cab for Cutie, Prodigy, Coldplay, The Killers, and Radiohead. He also listed Elton John as a huge influence and inspiration for him.

Discography

Studio albums

Singles

Other appearances

Tours
Spring Tour (2018)
Forever Tour (2022)

Filmography

References

External links
 
 

1989 births
Living people
21st-century American male actors
21st-century American singers
American male pop singers
American male singers
American male television actors
American male voice actors
American tenors
Big Time Rush (band) members
Columbia Records artists
Male actors from Texas
People from North Richland Hills, Texas
People from Temple, Texas
Singers from Texas
Songwriters from Texas